Ellesmere is a rapid transit station on Line 3 Scarborough of the Toronto subway in Toronto, Ontario, Canada. It is located at Ellesmere Road, between Kennedy Road and Midland Avenue. 

Ellesmere is the least-used station on the entire TTC network. On average, only 1,850 passengers boarded trains here each day in 2006–2007 and only 1,678 in 2007–2008. Part of the reason for this is that there are no bus bays or at least a direct connection to any bus stop at the station; passengers would have to walk to the nearest bus stop on Ellesmere Road.

In February 2021, the TTC recommended the closure of Line 3 in 2023 and its replacement by bus service until the completion of the Scarborough extension of Line 2 Bloor–Danforth. This closure would also include this station.

History
Ellesmere station opened in 1985, along with the rest of Line 3.

Station description
The station is located underneath the elevated section of Ellesmere Road, in the Kennedy Road and Midland Avenue corridor. The station is fairly small and is similar in appearance to Lawrence East station. It is built on two levels, with the ground level being the RT platforms and the single entrance and collector underneath it.

The entrance can be accessed from either side of the station through two sets of stairs, from either Kennedy Road or Midland Avenue via Service Road. Since entering the station requires the use of stairs, this station is not accessible whatsoever.

Parking
A commuter parking lot is located just east of the station, also underneath the elevated section of Ellesmere Road. As of January 1, 2012, the daily rate of parking from 5:00 am to 2:00 am is $3.00 on weekdays, while in the afternoon and evening rate from 3:00 pm and later is $2.00. Parking is free during weekends and statutory holidays. The capacity of the parking lot is 68 spots.

Rapid transit infrastructure in the vicinity
North of this station, the line turns 90° east, dipping briefly into a tunnel to cross underneath the nearby GO train tracks, then rising to an elevated structure for the remainder of its route towards Midland station. South of the station, the line continues to travel at ground level alongside the GO train tracks for the remainder of the route towards Lawrence East station.

Nearby landmarks
Nearby the station is the Roadsport Honda dealership and the former Scarborough Public Library HQ.

Surface connections 

Ellesmere station is the eastern terminus for Route 996 Wilson Express. The other routes use curbside stops on the street, and a transfer is required to connect between train and bus routes.

TTC routes serving the station include:

References

External links
 
 

Line 3 Scarborough stations
Railway stations in Canada opened in 1985